Kraljevo Airport may refer to any of these airports serving Kraljevo, Serbia:

 Morava/Lađevci Airport
 Brege Airport